Wallace Druce Elmer (January 1, 1898 – August 28, 1978) was a professional ice hockey player who played in the Western Canada Hockey League. He played with the  Saskatoon Crescents/Sheiks and Victoria Cougars. He won Stanley Cup with the Cougars in 1925.

External links

Wallace Elmer - Kingston & District Sports Hall of Fame

References 

1898 births
1978 deaths
Canadian ice hockey forwards
Place of death missing
Saskatoon Sheiks players
Stanley Cup champions
Victoria Cougars (1911–1926) players